Francisco Caballer Soteras (14 October 1932 – 5 September 2011) was a Spanish field hockey player, who won the bronze medal with the Men's National Team at the 1960 Summer Olympics in Rome, Italy.

Notes

References

External links
 
 
 
 

1932 births
2011 deaths
Spanish male field hockey players
Olympic field hockey players of Spain
Field hockey players at the 1960 Summer Olympics
Olympic bronze medalists for Spain
Olympic medalists in field hockey
Medalists at the 1960 Summer Olympics
20th-century Spanish people